The following is a summary of the 2021–22 season of competitive football in Switzerland.

National teams

Men's national team

2022 FIFA World Cup qualification

Friendly matches

UEFA Nations League

Group 2

Women's national team

Friendlies

2023 FIFA Women's World Cup qualification

2023 FIFA Women's World Cup qualification Group G

League season

Men

Credit Suisse Super League

Challenge League

Swiss Cup

Women

AXA Women's Super League

AXA Women's Cup

Swiss clubs in Europe

UEFA Champions League

Qualifying phase and play-off round

Second qualifying round

|}

Third qualifying round

|}

Play-off round

|}

Group stage

UEFA Europa Conference League

Qualifying phase and play-off round

Second qualifying round

|}

Third qualifying round

|}

Third qualifying round

|}

Group stage – Group H

UEFA Women's Champions League

Qualifying rounds

Round 1

Round 2

|}

Group stage

Notes

References

 
Seasons in Swiss football